The 1991 La Flèche Wallonne was the 55th edition of La Flèche Wallonne cycle race and was held on 17 April 1991. The race started in Spa and finished in Huy. The race was won by Moreno Argentin of the Ariostea team.

General classification

References

1991 in road cycling
1991
April 1991 sports events in Europe
1991 in Belgian sport